Belgium was represented by Fud Leclerc, with the song "Mon amour pour toi", at the 1960 Eurovision Song Contest, which took place on 19 March in London. The song was chosen in the Belgian national final on 24 January. This was the third of Leclerc's four appearances for Belgium at Eurovision.

Before Eurovision

Finale Belge pour le Grand Prix Eurovision 1960
Finale Belge pour le Grand Prix Eurovision 1960 was the national final format developed by INR in order to select Belgium's entry for the Eurovision Song Contest 1960. Five entries competed in the competition which was held on 24 January 1960 at the INR studios in Brussels, and was hosted by Georges Désir & Arlette Vincent. The winner was chosen by an "expert" jury. Among the other participants was Solange Berry, who had represented Luxembourg in the 1958 contest. The winning title "Mon amour pour toi" was written by Robert Montal and composed by Jack Say.

At Eurovision 
"Mon amour pour toi" was conducted by Henri Segers and performed 5th in the running order, following  and preceding . At the close of the voting it had received 9 points, placing Belgium 6th of the 13 entries. The Belgian jury awarded its highest mark (3) to contest winners France. It was succeeded as Belgian representative at the 1961 contest by Bob Benny performing "September, gouden roos".

Voting 
Every country had a jury of ten people. Every jury member could give one point to his or her favourite song.

References

External links 
  Info & lyrics for "Mon amour pour toi"

1960
Countries in the Eurovision Song Contest 1960
Eurovision